Caesium sulfide (also spelled cesium sulfide in American English) is an inorganic salt with a chemical formula Cs2S. It is a strong alkali in aqueous solution. In the air, caesium sulfide emits rotten egg smelling hydrogen sulfide.

Production 
Similar to sodium sulfide, anhydrous caesium sulfide can be produced by reacting caesium and sulfur in THF. It needs ammonia or naphthalene to react.
 2Cs + S → Cs2S
By dissolving hydrogen sulfide into caesium hydroxide solution, it will produce caesium bisulfide, then it will produce caesium sulfide too.。
  CsOH + H2S  →  CsHS + H2O
  CsHS + CsOH  →  Cs2S + H2O

References 

Caesium compounds
Sulfides